Ruy, the Little Cid is a animated adventure series produced by Spanish studio BRB Internacional and Televisión Española with animation by Japanese studio Nippon Animation. The series is based upon the life of El Cid, an 11th-century Spanish hero and was the first original project from Dogtanian creator Claudio Biern Boyd.

Synopisis

The story is about the imaginary adventures of the childhood of El Cid in Castile in the 11th century. At the beginning of each chapter there was a historical introduction of the moment: King Fernando I, always engaged in warfare against the rest of the peninsular kingdoms, had unified the Kingdom of Castile with that of León, something that was not accepted willingly by all the Leonese nobles. Meanwhile little Rodrigo (Rodrigo Díaz de Vivar or El Cid) dreams of being a brave knight.

Spanish Cast
Claudio Rodriguez as Narrator 
Ana Angeles Garcia as Ruy
Matilde Vilarino as Jimena
Teofilo Martinez as Fray Amadeo

Japanese Cast 
 Naoko Watanabe as Ruy
 Akiko Tsuboi as Teresa
 Kinpei Azusa as King Fernando

Episode list

References

External links

1980 Spanish television series debuts
1980 Spanish television series endings
1980 anime television series debuts
Cultural depictions of El Cid
Spanish children's animated adventure television series
Animation based on real people
TV Tokyo original programming
RTVE shows
Television series set in the 11th century
Historical anime and manga
Adventure anime and manga